71st meridian may refer to:

71st meridian east, a line of longitude east of the Greenwich Meridian
71st meridian west, a line of longitude west of the Greenwich Meridian